Sudha Narasimharaju is an Indian actress in the Kannada film industry. Some of the notable films of Sudha Narasimharaju as an actress include Rathasapthami (1986), Aruna Raaga (1986), and Shubha Milana (1987).

Career 
Sudha Narasimharaju has been part of more than 25 Kannada feature films.

Selected filmography

Aruna Raaga (1986) her debut film
Shanthi Nivasa (1988)
Samyuktha (1988)
Hrudaya Bandhana (1993)
Bahaddur Hennu (1993)
Nyayakkagi Saval (1994)
Rajakeeya (1993)
Kalyanothsava (1995)

Television
Gattimela(2019)

See also

List of people from Karnataka
Cinema of Karnataka
List of Indian film actresses
Cinema of India

References

External links 
 

Actresses in Kannada cinema
Living people
Kannada people
Actresses from Karnataka
Actresses from Bangalore
Indian film actresses
21st-century Indian actresses
Actresses in Kannada television
Year of birth missing (living people)